Thomas Greenhill may refer to:
 Thomas Greenhill (colonial administrator)
 Thomas Greenhill (surgeon)